Franz Wöhrer (born 5 June 1939) is a former football referee from Austria. He is best known for supervising one match in the 1982 FIFA World Cup in Spain, between Cameroon and Peru. On 22 April 1981 he supervised a UEFA Cup Wnners' Cup semifinal match between Feyenoord Rotterdam and Dinamo Tbilisi. Wöhrer retired in 1987.

External links 
 Franz Wöhrer at WorldFootball.net

1939 births
Austrian football referees
FIFA World Cup referees
1982 FIFA World Cup referees
Olympic football referees
Football referees at the 1980 Summer Olympics
Living people